Arizona Proposition 207 was a voter initiative that appeared on the November 3, 2020, Arizona general election ballot to legalize cannabis for recreational use. Passing with 60% of the vote, the initiative legalized the possession of up to an ounce of cannabis, licensed sales at dispensaries, and personal cultivation of up to six plants. Along with Montana, New Jersey and South Dakota, Arizona is one of four states that legalized recreational marijuana via ballot measures in 2020.

The first state-licensed recreational marijuana sales in Arizona took place on January 22, 2021, making Arizona the fastest state to go from a legalization vote to retail sales in U.S. history.

Provisions
Proposition 207, also known as the Smart and Safe Act, legalizes the adult recreational use of marijuana, specifically by allowing adults 21 and older in Arizona to possess up to 1 ounce (28 g) of marijuana (with no more than 5 grams being marijuana concentrate), and to have up to 6 marijuana plants at their home (with up to 12 marijuana plants in households with two or more adult members). It directs the state Department of Health Services to set forth rules for retail marijuana sales by June 1, 2021, allow marijuana to be subject to state and local sales taxes like other retail items, and imposes an additional 16% excise tax on marijuana products, with the revenue being split between the state government agencies responsible for activities relating to the act, highways, community college districts, police departments, and fire departments. The initiative provides that employers may still adopt "drug-free workplace" policies and restrict employees' and applicants' use of marijuana, and provides that the initiative does not permit marijuana use in public spaces. The initiative establishes that the possession of more than an ounce (28 g), but less than 2.5 ounces (71 g), of marijuana, by an adult is a petty offense. The initiative prohibits the sale of marijuana products that resemble a "human, animal, insect, fruit, toy or cartoon" and sets forth penalties for possession of marijuana by minors (which, for a first offense for possession of under an ounce of marijuana, is a $100 fine and drug counseling).

The proposition imposes a 16 percent excise tax on cannabis. The first share of revenue will be used to enforce state cannabis regulations, with the remainder divided as follows: 33% for community colleges, 31.4% for police and fire departments, 25.4% for a highway fund, 10% for a justice fund, and 0.2% to the state attorney general for enforcement.

History
The Arizona Dispensaries Association and Arizona Cannabis Chamber of Commerce began organizing in August 2019 for another ballot initiative after a failed November 2016 ballot initiative. The Arizona Dispensaries Association filed a ballot initiative application on September 26, 2019, for the "Smart and Safe Act," seeking to obtain the necessary 237,645 signatures from registered Arizona voters by the July 2, 2020 deadline to get on the November 3, 2020 ballot.

Arizona legalization initiative, sponsored by Smart and Safe Arizona, had received 150,000 signatures by January 17, 2020, out of a required 237,645 signatures. The initiative likely had exceeded the minimum 237,645 valid signatures by April to appear on the November ballot. On July 1 the sponsors announced they had submitted over 420,000 signatures to the Secretary of State. On August 10, Secretary of State Katie Hobbs announced the initiative had qualified for the 2020 ballot as Proposition (Prop) 207.

The Associated Press announced that the initiative had passed on election day, November 3, 2020.

Polling
Likely voters polled in July 2020 indicated 62% support for cannabis legalization.

On Proposition 207

On whether recreational marijuana should be legal

Results

Notes 

Partisan clients

See also 
 Cannabis in Arizona
 2020 Montana Initiative 190
 2020 New Jersey Public Question 1
 2020 South Dakota Constitutional Amendment A

References

External links
 Arizona Proposition 207, Marijuana Legalization Initiative (2020) at Ballotpedia

proposition 207
Arizona Proposition 207
Arizona ballot measures
2020 cannabis law reform
Cannabis in Arizona
Initiatives in the United States
Cannabis ballot measures in the United States